Austro-Russian Alliance refers to the treaty signed by the Austrian Empire and the Russian Empire in May–June 1781. Russia was previously allied with Prussia (Russo-Prussian Alliance). However, with time, Russia's attention was increasingly drawn towards the south, and the Ottoman Empire.  Advocated by Grigory Potemkin, the new direction reduced the strategic value of Prussia as an ally to Russia and made Austria once again a more appealing candidate. The Russo-Prussian Alliance was once again extended in 1777, but at the imperial court in Saint Petersburg, Nikita Ivanovich Panin's pro-Prussian faction had its influence eclipsed by the Potemkin's pro-Austrian faction.

After the death of Maria Theresa of Austria, Joseph II of Austria wanted to improve relations with Russia, and secret negotiations begun in early 1781 and resulted in an Austro-Russian alliance being formed around May and June 1781. The Russo-Prussian alliance existed formally until 1788 but lost most of its significance upon the declaration of the Austro–Russian alliance, which isolated Prussia on the international scene. The most notable consequences of the Austro-Russian alliance were the Austro-Turkish War (1788–1791) and the Russo-Turkish War (1787–1792). In 1790, the alliance was strained since Russia informed Austria that it has no desire to interfere in a possible conflict erupting between Austria and Prussia.

References

Sources
 
 De Madariaga, Isabel. "The secret Austro-Russian treaty of 1781." Slavonic and East European Review 38.90 (1959): 114–145. online
 Mayer, Matthew Z. "The Price for Austria's Security: Part I—Joseph II, the Russian Alliance, and the Ottoman War, 1787–1789." International History Review 26.2 (2004): 257–299. online

1781 treaties
Treaties of the Habsburg monarchy
Treaties of the Russian Empire
1781 in Austria
1781 in the Russian Empire
Austria–Russia relations
1781 in the Habsburg monarchy
Habsburg monarchy–Russia relations
Bilateral treaties of Russia
18th-century military alliances